Boduf Songs is the stage name of Southampton electro-acoustic musician Mat Sweet.

Sweet first began recording as Boduf Songs in 2004, using field recordings in addition to recordings he made at home. He self-released these as a CD-R and Kranky Records reissued the album in 2005. Three further albums followed on Kranky. In 2013 he moved to Southern Records for his fifth full-length; a sixth, on Flenser Records, followed in 2015.

Discography
Boduf Songs (Kranky Records, 2005)
Lion Devours the Sun (Kranky Records, 2006)
How Shadows Chase the Balance (Kranky Records, 2008)
This Alone Above All Else in Spite of Everything (Kranky Records, 2010)
Burnt Up on Re-Entry (Southern Records, 2013)
Stench of Exist (Flenser Records, 2015)
Abyss Versions (Orindal Records, 2019)

References

English folk musicians
English electronic musicians